Peter Sanders (born 1967) is a German computer scientist who works as a professor of computer science at the Karlsruhe Institute of Technology. His research concerns the design, analysis, and implementation of algorithms and data structures, and he is particularly known for his research on suffix sorting finding shortest paths in road networks.

Sanders earned his Ph.D. from Karlsruhe in 1996,
and worked for seven years at the Max Planck Institute for Informatics in Saarbrücken (completing his habilitation there in 2000) before returning to Karlsruhe as a professor in 2004.

Sanders was one of the winners of the Gottfried Wilhelm Leibniz Prize in 2012.

Selected publications
Books

Research papers
.
.
.
.

References

External links
Google scholar profile

1967 births
Living people
German computer scientists
Academic staff of the Karlsruhe Institute of Technology
Gottfried Wilhelm Leibniz Prize winners